King's Highway 138, commonly referred to as Highway 138, is a provincially maintained highway in eastern Ontario, Canada. It extends from former Highway 2 in Cornwall, north to Highway 417 east of Casselman. Highway 138 provides access to the Seaway International Bridge, connecting Cornwall with Massena, New York.

Highway 138 was first established in 1967, connecting Highway 2, now Vincent Massey Drive, with Highway 43 in Monkland. By the mid-1970s, the route had been extended north to meet with the newly opened Highway 417. Since then it has remained unchanged.

Route description 

Highway 138 is a  highway that crosses the Laurentian Valley in eastern Ontario, connecting Highway 401 in Cornwall with Highway 417 east of Casselman.

The route begins at 9th Street West, which was Highway 2 until the late 90s, and proceeds north along the western side of Cornwall; this section is maintained under a Connecting Link agreement and is locally known as Brookdale Avenue.
After crossing Highway 401, at which there is an interchange, the route encounters Cornwall Centre Road, onto which it turns east. After following it for a brief distance, the highway turns north onto St. Andrews Road; the Connecting Link agreement ends at this junction.

Over the next two kilometres (1.25 mi), the highway exits the fringes of Cornwall, passing through the neighbourhood of Churchill Heights. After passing Headline Road (County Road 44), the route divides a forest and then enters an agricultural area before coming upon the community of St. Andrews West. It crosses the Raisin River and continues north through a mix of farmland and forests.

Like other provincial routes in Ontario, Highway 138 is maintained by the Ministry of Transportation of Ontario. In 2010, traffic surveys conducted by the ministry showed that on average, 11,200 vehicles used the highway daily along the section between Cornwall Centre Road and Kings Road in Saint Andrews while 5,200 vehicles did so each day along the section between Stormont, Dundas and Glengarry County Roads 43 and 22, the highest and lowest counts along the highway, respectively.

History 
Highway 138 was established by the Department of Highways on May 1, 1967, following existing Stormont County roads between Highway 2 at the Seaway International Bridge and Highway 43.
With the construction of Highway 417 planned and progressing eastward from Ottawa, Highway 138 was extended north to its present terminus east of Casselman in 1971 or 1972.

Budget constraints brought on by a recession in the 1990s resulted in the Mike Harris provincial government forming the Who Does What? committee to determine cost-cutting measures in order to balance the budget after a deficit incurred by former premier Bob Rae.
It was determined that many Ontario highways no longer serve long-distance traffic movement and should therefore be maintained by local or regional levels of government. The MTO consequently transferred many highways to lower levels of government in 1997 and 1998, removing a significant percentage of the provincial highway network.
On January 1, 1998,  of Highway 138 was transferred to the City of Cornwall. This section is now known as Brookdale Avenue.

Major intersections

References

138